Sufi Abdul Hamid (born Eugene Brown) (January 6, 1903 in Lowell, Massachusetts – July 30, 1938) was an African-American religious and labor leader and was among the first African-American converts to Islam. An admirer of Mufti Amin al-Husseini, he was called an anti-Semite by his detractors. He is best known for his role in the early 1930s business boycotts in Harlem that were designed to draw attention to discriminatory employment practices of white, mainly Italian and Jewish, business owners.

Life

Religious activism
In Chicago, he styled himself Bishop Conshankin, a Buddhist cleric, then moved to New York in 1932, taking up residence in Harlem. Despite converting to Islam, he probably had no connection with the Nation of Islam. He eventually styled himself His Holiness Bishop Amiru Al-Mu-Minin Sufi A. Hamid, and his press man claimed that he had been born in Egypt beneath the shadow of a pyramid. He sported a mustache and dressed flamboyantly, wearing a Nazi-style military shirt, gold-lined cape, purple turban, and a dagger in his belt.

During the Great Depression, unemployment among black people in Harlem reached 50%. Hamid initiated an effort to encourage white business owners in Harlem to hire black workers, often picketing stores and giving speeches on street corners. Author Claude McKay was a Harlem resident during the period and wrote extensively about Sufi Abdul Hamid and related labor issues and organizing as an informed eyewitness in articles for Nation, Amsterdam News, and New Leader, collected in The Passion of Claude McKay (Schocken, 1973, p. 239–249).  A long chapter of his essay collection, Harlem:  Negro Metropolis (Dutton, 1940, p. 181–262) provides a balanced factual account, a reliable witness, factual, unbiased, untendentious.

Hamid, according to his detractors, was anti-Semitic, but a New York City court dismissed the charge, as McKay reported in one of his articles for Nation, and in any case his organization and others, such as the Harlem Citizens League, were not picketing Harlem stores because of their Jewish, Greek, or other ownership but because they refused to employ Negroes.

His union changed names many times, from the Negro Industrial and Clerical Alliance to the Afro-American Federation of Labor. Adam Clayton Powell briefly joined forces with him in labor protests and store boycotts, and broke ranks when his rhetoric moved beyond targeting whites and Jews to light-skinned black people. Violent clashes with rival black unions led to Hamid being arrested for stabbing Hammie Snipes, a former follower of Marcus Garvey who became a Communist labor union organizer; in October 1936, the courts sentenced him to 20 days in prison. Eventually, the courts barred Hamid from picketing, leading him to shift his focus to his mosque, the Universal Holy Temple of Tranquility; there, he dubbed himself a bishop, gaining the new nickname of "the Black Mufti." He would go on to open up his organization to Jewish members on August 31, 1937.

Marriage and murder

He married Stephanie St. Clair, who ran Harlem's numbers racket but had since then retired, in July 1936. They signed a contract binding themselves and stipulated portions of their mutual assets together for 99 years. All St. Clair's resources were bound to him and $10,000 of his were placed in a trust for her. The paper signed was not legally enforceable, but Hamid claimed that it was binding by sharia law. According to St. Clair's account, Hamid had approached her in June, asking her to finance a movie he wished to make. She turned him down, and multiples after that instance, but he continued to visit and converse with her. One night, he came to her late at night and proclaimed his love for her, asking for her hand in marriage. St. Clair told him she needed three days to think it over, and eventually accepted.

On January 18, 1938, Hamid was shot on his way to see a lawyer, and St. Clair was charged with the crime. In the trial that followed, St. Clair stated that Hamid was a gambler and often financially broke, trying to convince St. Clair to invest in questionable business propositions to recoup his losses. She also claimed that he kept a mistress, the popular Harlem mystic and fortune-teller Dorothy Matthews, self stylized as "Madame Fu Futtam." She even alleged that Futtam had poisoned her with edible gifts, and worked to gain her trust when she was ill, before going on to borrow money to buy provisions for St. Clair that never materialized. Though Hamid denied the affair, weeks after the court trial and divorce, Futtam and Hamid would get legally married.

In August 1, 1938, Hamid, along with his white pilot, died when Hamid's private airplane ran out of fuel and crashed on Long Island. Hamid had purposely undersupplied his plane with fuel in attempt to convince his followers that the luxury of owning it was mitigated by keeping it low on fuel. His white secretary, Catherine Price, was seriously injured but survived. After his death, his widow attempted to keep the mosque going by claiming nightly visitations by him from beyond the grave; she predicted that he would return in sixty days, which failed to materialize. Today, the site at 103 Morningside Avenue is the home of St. Luke's Baptist Church.

See also
African-American – Jewish relations

References
Thomson, Mark, "Sufi Abdul Hamid" in Encyclopedia of the Harlem Renaissance, Volume 1 Cary D. Wintz (Ed.), p. 459–460.
Russell, Thadeus, "Sufi Abdul Hamid" in Harlem Renaissance lives from the African American national biography, Henry Louis Gates (Ed.), p. 235–236.
"No place like home" Time magazine, 31 July 1964
Diner, Hasia R. In the almost promised land: American Jews and Blacks, 1915–1935
McDowell, Winston C., "Keeping them 'In the same boat together'?" in  African Americans and Jews in the twentieth century: studies in convergence and conflict, Vincent Franklin, pp. 227–229.

Notes

1903 births
1938 deaths
African-American religious leaders
African-American Muslims
American trade union leaders
African-American trade unionists
African American–Jewish relations
People from Lowell, Massachusetts
People from Harlem
Victims of aviation accidents or incidents in the United States
20th-century African-American people